Nord 2.231 à 2.305 were suburban 4-4-4T locomotives of the Chemins de Fer du Nord. They were nicknamed "Revolver" due to the appearance of the high-pitched small diameter boilers next to the low water tanks and cabs,

At nationalisation on 1 January 1938, they all passed to the Société nationale des chemins de fer français (SNCF), who renumbered them 2-222.TA.1 to 2-222.TA.75.

Construction history 
The locomotives were built in three batches at the Nord's two workshops at La Chapelle, Paris and Hellemmes, Lille.

Models 
The "Revolvers" have been reproduced in HO scale by the British firm DJH Model Loco as a kit with an etched brass chassis and white metal superstructure.

Notes et references 

Steam locomotives of France
2.231
4-4-4T locomotives
Railway locomotives introduced in 1901

Passenger locomotives